Daunte is a given name. Notable people with the name include:

Daunte Culpepper (born 1977), American football player
Daunte Wright (died 2021), African American man fatally shot during an arrest

See also
Dante (name), given name and surname